Saphan Khwai station is a BTS skytrain station, on the Sukhumvit Line in Phaya Thai District, Bangkok, Thailand. The station is located on Phahonyothin Road near Saphan Khwai intersection, the dense trade area with many shops, fresh markets and apartments, at the front of Saphan Khwai market and Paolo Memorial Hospital. Big C Supercenter (Saphan Khwai branch) and Thai Philatelic Museum (stamp museum) at Sam Sen Nai post office are located to the south of the station.

See also
 Bangkok Skytrain

BTS Skytrain stations